Parsteiner See is a lake in the Schorfheide-Chorin Biosphere Reserve in Brandenburg, Germany. At an elevation of 44 m, its surface area is 10.03 km². It is located in the municipality of Parsteinsee, Barnim district.

External links 

 

Lakes of Brandenburg
Barnim